In mathematics and computer science, the binary Goppa code is an error-correcting code that belongs to the class of general Goppa codes originally described by Valerii Denisovich Goppa, but the binary structure gives it several mathematical advantages over non-binary variants, also providing a better fit for common usage in computers and telecommunication. Binary Goppa codes have interesting properties suitable for cryptography in McEliece-like cryptosystems and similar setups.

Construction and properties

Codewords belong to the kernel of the syndrome function, forming a subspace of :

 

The code defined by a tuple  has dimension at least  and
distance at least , thus it can encode messages of length at least  using codewords of size  while correcting at least  errors. It possesses a convenient parity-check matrix  in form

 

Note that this form of the parity-check matrix, being composed of a Vandermonde matrix  and diagonal matrix , shares the form with check matrices of alternant codes, thus alternant decoders can be used on this form. Such decoders usually provide only limited error-correcting capability (in most cases ).

Decoding

Decoding of binary Goppa codes is traditionally done by Patterson algorithm, which gives good error-correcting capability (it corrects all  design errors), and is also fairly simple to implement.

Patterson algorithm converts a syndrome to a vector of errors. The syndrome of a binary word  is expected to take a form of

 

Alternative form of a parity-check matrix based on formula for  can be used to produce such syndrome with a simple matrix multiplication.

The algorithm then computes . That fails when , but that is the case when the input word is a codeword, so no error correction is necessary.

Note that in binary case, locating the errors is sufficient to correct them, as there's only one other value possible. In non-binary cases a separate error correction polynomial has to be computed as well.

 

Factoring or evaluating all roots of  therefore gives enough information to recover the error vector and fix the errors.

Properties and usage

Binary Goppa codes viewed as a special case of Goppa codes have the interesting property that they correct full  errors, while only  errors in ternary and all other cases. Asymptotically, this error correcting capability meets the famous Gilbert–Varshamov bound.

Because of the high error correction capacity compared to code rate and form of parity-check matrix (which is usually hardly distinguishable from a random binary matrix of full rank), the binary Goppa codes are used in several post-quantum cryptosystems, notably McEliece cryptosystem and Niederreiter cryptosystem.

References

 Elwyn R. Berlekamp, Goppa Codes, IEEE Transactions on information theory, Vol. IT-19, No. 5, September 1973, https://web.archive.org/web/20170829142555/http://infosec.seu.edu.cn/space/kangwei/senior_thesis/Goppa.pdf
 Daniela Engelbert, Raphael Overbeck, Arthur Schmidt. "A summary of McEliece-type cryptosystems and their security." Journal of Mathematical Cryptology 1, 151–199. . Previous version: http://eprint.iacr.org/2006/162/
 Daniel J. Bernstein. "List decoding for binary Goppa codes." http://cr.yp.to/codes/goppalist-20110303.pdf

See also

 BCH codes
 Code rate
 Reed–Solomon error correction

Coding theory